Khilok may refer to:
Khilok (river), a river in eastern Siberia, Russia
Khilok (inhabited locality), name of several inhabited localities in Russia